is a Japanese announcer for TV Tokyo, and former RKB Mainichi Broadcasting announcer.

Appearances

Current
Tsuiseki Live! Sports Watcher (Oct 2016 –)
Weekday ver.
Mondays; 3 Oct 2016 – 27 Mar 2017
Fridays; 7 Apr 2017 –
Moya Moya Summers 2 (3rd Assistant) – 23 Oct 2016 –

Former

TV Tokyo
Sokuhō! Rio de Janeiro Olympic – 11 Aug 2016
2016 Tour de France Saitama Criterium – 19 Oct 2016

RKB Mainichi Broadcasting

Television
Sunday Watch – Sports Corner
Kyō-kan TV (Changed corner from Apr 2015)
Premium Marche: Shifuku no Okurimono – Narration
Shunkan Sports (14 Apr 2014 – End)
Joshi-ana no Batsu Shinshun Special (5 Jan 2014)

Radio
Voicebook 10 Oct 2013 – 27 Mar 2014
Koji Sakurai: Insight – 2016*Mizuki Tanaka's substitute

School days
BS Fuji News (BS Fuji) – Jul 2011 – Jan 2012

References

Notes

References

External links
 – TV Tokyo Official 
 

Japanese announcers
Rikkyo University alumni
People from Fukuoka
1991 births
Living people